Dennis Robertson may refer to:

 Dennis Robertson (economist) (1890–1963), English economist
 Dennis Robertson (ice hockey) (born 1991), Canadian ice hockey defenceman
 Dennis Robertson (politician) (born 1956), Former SNP MSP for Aberdeenshire West

de:Dennis Robertson